This is a list of unnumbered trans-Neptunian objects (TNOs) first observed since 1993 and grouped by the year of principal provisional designation. The data is sourced from the Minor Planet Center's (MPC) List of Trans Neptunian Objects and List Of Centaurs and Scattered-Disk Objects. These objects will eventually be numbered as secured discoveries with an official discoverer determined by the MPC. Until then, additional observations are needed to sufficiently decrease an object's orbital uncertainty. , there are 3,141 unnumbered objects, defined here as minor planets with a semi-major axis larger than 30.1 AU (Neptune's average orbital distance from the Sun).

The list also contains information from "Johnston's Archive", such as an object's diameter, its dynamical class and binary status with the satellite's diameter, as well as its albedo, spectral taxonomy and B–R color index. Members of the extreme trans-Neptunian objects (ESDOs, EDDOs and sednoids) – with a semi-major axis greater than 150 AU and perihelion greater than 30 AU – are also identified.

Statistics

List

1993

1994

1995

1996

1997

1998

1999–2007 

 List of unnumbered trans-Neptunian objects: 1999
 List of unnumbered trans-Neptunian objects: 2000
 List of unnumbered trans-Neptunian objects: 2001
 List of unnumbered trans-Neptunian objects: 2002
 List of unnumbered trans-Neptunian objects: 2003
 List of unnumbered trans-Neptunian objects: 2004
 List of unnumbered trans-Neptunian objects: 2005
 List of unnumbered trans-Neptunian objects: 2006
 List of unnumbered trans-Neptunian objects: 2007

2008

2009–2016 

 List of unnumbered trans-Neptunian objects: 2009
 List of unnumbered trans-Neptunian objects: 2010
 List of unnumbered trans-Neptunian objects: 2011
 List of unnumbered trans-Neptunian objects: 2012
 List of unnumbered trans-Neptunian objects: 2013
 List of unnumbered trans-Neptunian objects: 2014
 List of unnumbered trans-Neptunian objects: 2015
 List of unnumbered trans-Neptunian objects: 2016

2017

2018

2019

2020

2021

2022

Ignored objects 
The Minor Planet Center does not include the following 111 objects with a semi-major axis larger than that of Neptune in its respective lists (see ). The data is sourced from the List of Known Trans-Neptunian Objects at Johnston's Archive.

See also 
 List of unnumbered minor planets
 List of the brightest Kuiper belt objects
 List of Solar System objects by greatest aphelion
 List of Solar System objects most distant from the Sun

Notes

References

External links 
 How many dwarf planets are there in the outer solar system?, Michael Brown, Caltech
 OSSOS TNODB by the Outer Solar System Origins Survey
 Known extreme outer solar system objects, Scott Sheppard, Carnegie Science Center

Lists of trans-Neptunian objects